Obaro may refer to:

 Obaro, a leadership role in the city of Kabba, Kogi, Nigeria
 John Obaro (born 1963), Nigerian technology entrepreneur and public speaker, founder of SystemSpecs

See also
 Obara (disambiguation)